Dugan of the Dugouts is a 1928 American silent comedy film directed by Bobby Ray and starring Pauline Garon, Danny O'Shea and Ernest Hilliard. It was one of two films directed by Ray, a former silent-era film comedian, who later worked as an assistant director.

Synopsis
Because his girlfriend likes the look of a uniform, a young man enlists in the army. They both then get caught up in a foreign spy ring.

Cast
 Pauline Garon as Betty
 Danny O'Shea as Danny Dugan
 Ernest Hilliard as Sgt. Davis
 J.P. McGowan as Capt. von Brinken
 Sid Smith as Danny's Buddy 
 Alice Knowland

References

Bibliography
 Munden, Kenneth White. The American Film Institute Catalog of Motion Pictures Produced in the United States, Part 1. University of California Press, 1997.

External links

1928 films
1928 comedy films
Silent American comedy films
Films directed by Bobby Ray
American silent feature films
1920s English-language films
American black-and-white films
1920s American films